The German torpedo boat T11 was one of a dozen Type 35 torpedo boats built for the Kriegsmarine (German Navy) during the late 1930s. Completed in mid-1940, the boat was deployed in the English Channel later that year and returned to Germany in December. She then supported operations in the Baltic Sea after the start of Operation Barbarossa in June. T11 was transferred to France at the end of the year and helped to escort a pair of battleships and a heavy cruiser through the Channel back to Germany in the Channel Dash in early 1942. She then escorted German ships in Norwegian waters for several months and was placed in reserve when she returned to Germany. The boat spent all of 1943 and 1944 either refitting or assigned to the Torpedo School. T11 returned to active duty at the beginning of 1945 and survived the war. The boat was allocated to the British after the war, but she was transferred to France in 1946. Unused by the French Navy, she was stricken from the Navy List in 1951 and subsequently scrapped.

Design and description
The Type 35 was an unsuccessful attempt by the Kriegsmarine to design a fast, ocean-going torpedo boat that did not exceed the  displacement limit of the London Naval Treaty for ships that counted against the national tonnage limit. Their crew numbered 119 officers and sailors.

As built, the Type 35 class mounted a single  SK C/32 gun on the stern. Anti-aircraft defense was provided by a single  SK C/30 anti-aircraft gun superfiring over the 10.5 cm gun and a pair of  C/30 guns on the bridge wings. They carried six above-water  torpedo tubes in two triple mounts and could also carry 30 mines (or 60 if the weather was good). Many boats exchanged the 3.7 cm gun for another 2 cm gun, depth charges and minesweeping paravanes before completion. Late-war additions were limited to the installation of radar, radar detectors and additional AA guns, usually at the expense of the aft torpedo tube mount.

Construction and career
T11 was ordered on 29 June 1936 from DeSchiMAG, laid down at their Bremen shipyard on 1 July 1938 as yard number 938, launched on 1 March 1939 and commissioned on 24 May 1940. The boat was working up until July when she was transferred to the Skaggerak for convoy escort duties. On 18 September, T11 was slightly damaged by bomb splinters when the Royal Air Force bombed Cherbourg, France. Several of her crew were wounded during the attack. She returned to Germany in December and was decommissioned for repairs that lasted until June 1941.

The boat was transferred to France around the beginning of 1942. As part of the preparations for the Channel Dash, the Kriegsmarine substituted a quadruple 2 cm mount for T11s aft torpedo tubes and added a 2 cm single mount at the bow to reinforce the boat's anti-aircraft suite. T11s torpedo tubes were replaced afterwards, although the quadruple mounting may have been moved to the aft superfiring position and she also may have kept her bow-chaser. T11 returned to Germany that month and was placed in reserve until the end of the year.

The boat was recommissioned in January 1943 and was assigned to the Torpedo School in April. She began a refit in mid-1944 that lasted until December when she was assigned to the 3rd Torpedo Boat Flotilla in the Baltic. On 2 April 1945, T11 was involved in a collision with the minesweeper R 256 east of Bornholm Island, which was sunk by Soviet aircraft later that day. The torpedo boat was allocated to the British when the Allies divided the surviving ships of the Kriegsmarine amongst themselves in late 1945. The Royal Navy had no interest in her and she was transferred to France in February 1946 and was renamed Bir Hacheim on 4 February. The boat was immediately placed in reserve until she was stricken on 8 October 1951 and subsequently scrapped.

Notes

References

External links
Type 35 on German Navy.de

Type 35 torpedo boats
1939 ships